MDSC may refer to:
 Mediterranean–Dead Sea Canal
 Myeloid-derived suppressor cell, immunosuppressive cells from the myeloid lineage
 MDSc, a dental degree
 Mount Diablo Silverado Council